Germán Schacht Verdugo (born 24 October 1961) is a sailor from Chile, who represented his country at the 1988 Summer Olympics in Busan, South Korea as helmsman in the Soling. With crew members Rodrigo Zvazola and Manuel Gonzalez they took the 20th place.

Notes

References

External links
 
 
 

1961 births
Living people
Chilean male sailors (sport)
Olympic sailors of Chile
Sailors at the 1988 Summer Olympics – Soling